Mark D. Blount (born November 30, 1975) is an American retired professional basketball center with four teams in the National Basketball Association between 2000 and 2009.

Career
Blount spent his freshman year of high school in Summerville, South Carolina, playing for Summerville High School.  He then transferred to Oak Hill Academy. He then went to Dobbs Ferry High School for his senior year and was named Mr. Basketball for Westchester County.  He played his collegiate basketball at the University of Pittsburgh before being drafted 54th overall in the 1997 NBA Draft by the Seattle SuperSonics, and spent three seasons in the minor American leagues.

He was first signed by the Boston Celtics as a free agent on August 1, 2000 and led the team with 76 blocks that season, the most by a Celtics rookie since Kevin McHale in 1980–81.

During the 2003–04 NBA season, Blount put up 10.3 points, 7.2 rebounds, and 1.29 blocks per game in 29.3 minutes per game. He had a 28-point, 21-rebound game vs. the Orlando Magic on March 1, 2004. Following the season, Blount signed a six-year, $41 million contract with the Celtics.

Off the court
When his career ended in 2010, Blount purchased investment properties in Palm Beach Gardens, Florida as well as opening Auntie Anne's franchises in the area. As of 2018, he lived in Fort Lauderdale, Florida and continued to invest in real estate. He is the author of the book My First Triple Double.

Transactions 
 August 1, 2000 – Signed with the Boston Celtics as a free agent.
 August 8, 2002 – Signed with the Denver Nuggets as a free agent.
 February 20, 2003 – Traded to the Boston Celtics.
 On January 26, 2006, Blount, along with Ricky Davis, Marcus Banks, Justin Reed, and two conditional second-round draft picks, were traded to the Minnesota Timberwolves for Wally Szczerbiak, Michael Olowokandi, Dwayne Jones and a conditional first-round draft pick.
 On October 24, 2007, Blount was traded to the Miami Heat along with teammate Ricky Davis in exchange for the Heat's Antoine Walker, Michael Doleac, Wayne Simien and a first-round draft pick.
 On August 13, 2009, he was traded back to the Minnesota Timberwolves for Quentin Richardson.
On March 1, 2010, Blount was waived by the Timberwolves.

NBA career statistics

Regular season 

|-
| style="text-align:left;"| 
| style="text-align:left;"| Boston
| 64 || 50 || 17.2 || .505 || .000 || .697 || 3.6 || .5 || .6 || 1.2 || 3.9
|-
| style="text-align:left;"| 
| style="text-align:left;"| Boston
| 44 || 0 || 9.4 || .421 || .000 || .811 || 1.9 || .2 || .4 || .4 || 2.1
|-
| style="text-align:left;"| 
| style="text-align:left;"| Denver
| 54 || 24 || 16.4 || .393 || .000 || .717 || 3.4 || .6 || .4 || .9 || 5.2
|-
| style="text-align:left;"| 
| style="text-align:left;"| Boston
| 27 || 7 || 19.2 || .563 || .000 || .750 || 4.6 || .8 || .7 || .6 || 4.4
|-
| style="text-align:left;"| 
| style="text-align:left;"| Boston
| 82 || 73 || 29.3 || .566 || .000 || .719 || 7.2 || .9 || 1.0 || 1.3 || 10.3
|-
| style="text-align:left;"| 
| style="text-align:left;"| Boston
| 82 || 57 || 26.0 || .529 || .000 || .713 || 4.8 || 1.6 || .4 || .8 || 9.4
|-
| style="text-align:left;"| 
| style="text-align:left;"| Boston
| 39 || 25 || 27.8 || .511 || .000 || .764 || 4.2 || 1.7 || .4 || .9 || 12.4
|-
| style="text-align:left;"| 
| style="text-align:left;"| Minnesota
| 42 || 30 || 27.5 || .506 || .000 || .747 || 4.8 || .8 || .6 || 1.0 || 10.2
|-
| style="text-align:left;"| 
| style="text-align:left;"| Minnesota
| 82 || 81 || 31.0 || .509 || .290 || .754 || 6.2 || .8 || .5 || .7 || 12.3
|-
| style="text-align:left;"| 
| style="text-align:left;"| Miami
| 69 || 46 || 22.3 || .462 || .386 || .638 || 3.8 || .6 || .5 || .5 || 8.4
|-
| style="text-align:left;"| 
| style="text-align:left;"| Miami
| 20 || 0 || 10.4 || .385 || .407 || .615 || 2.1 || .2 || .1 || .4 || 4.0
|- class="sortbottom"
| style="text-align:center;" colspan="2"| Career
| 605 || 393 || 23.1 || .504 || .359 || .723 || 4.6 || .8 || .5 || .8 || 8.2

Playoffs 

|-
| style="text-align:left;"| 2002
| style="text-align:left;"| Boston
| 4 || 0 || 9.8 || .500 || .000 || 1.000 || 1.8 || .3 || .5 || .5 || 1.5
|-
| style="text-align:left;"| 2003
| style="text-align:left;"| Boston
| 10 || 0 || 14.4 || .545 || .000 || .700 || 3.6 || .2 || 1.1 || .8 || 3.1
|-
| style="text-align:left;"| 2004
| style="text-align:left;"| Boston
| 4 || 4 || 36.3 || .486 || .000 || .737 || 9.3 || 1.0 || 1.5 || 2.0 || 12.0
|-
| style="text-align:left;"| 2005
| style="text-align:left;"| Boston
| 4 || 0 || 10.8 || .286 || .000 || .000 || 1.5 || .3 || .0 || .0 || 2.0
|- class="sortbottom"
| style="text-align:center;" colspan="2"| Career
| 22 || 4 || 16.9 || .467 || .000 || .697 || 3.9 || .4 || .9 || .8 || 4.2

Notes

External links
 
 Mark Blount Stats at ESPN
 

1975 births
Living people
American expatriate basketball people in France
American men's basketball players
Baltimore Bayrunners players
Basketball players from New York (state)
Basketball players from South Carolina
Boston Celtics players
Centers (basketball)
Denver Nuggets players
La Crosse Bobcats players
Minnesota Timberwolves players
Miami Heat players
Parade High School All-Americans (boys' basketball)
Paris Racing Basket players
People from Summerville, South Carolina
Sportspeople from Yonkers, New York
Pittsburgh Panthers men's basketball players
Power forwards (basketball)
Seattle SuperSonics draft picks
Yakima Sun Kings players
United States Basketball League players
Oak Hill Academy (Mouth of Wilson, Virginia) alumni